In topology, a proximity space, also called a nearness space, is an axiomatization of the intuitive notion of "nearness" that hold set-to-set, as opposed to the better known point-to-set notion that characterize topological spaces.

The concept was described by  but ignored at the time. It was rediscovered and axiomatized by V. A. Efremovič in 1934 under the name of infinitesimal space, but not published until 1951. In the interim,  discovered a version of the same concept under the name of separation space.

Definition 

A   is a set  with a relation  between subsets of  satisfying the following properties:

For all subsets 
  implies 
  implies 
  implies 
  implies ( or )
 (For all   or ) implies 
Proximity without the first axiom is called  (but then Axioms 2 and 4 must be stated in a two-sided fashion).

The main properties of this set neighborhood relation, listed below, provide an alternative axiomatic characterization of proximity spaces.

For all subsets 
 
  implies 
  implies 
 ( and ) implies 
  implies 
  implies that there exists some  such that 

A proximity space is called  if implies 

In the same notation, this means if  holds in  then  holds in

Properties 

Given a proximity space, one can define a topology by letting  be a Kuratowski closure operator. If the proximity space is separated, the resulting topology is Hausdorff. Proximity maps will be continuous between the induced topologies.

The resulting topology is always completely regular. This can be proven by imitating the usual proofs of Urysohn's lemma, using the last property of proximal neighborhoods to create the infinite increasing chain used in proving the lemma.

Given a compact Hausdorff space, there is a unique proximity whose corresponding topology is the given topology:  is near  if and only if their closures intersect. More generally, proximities classify the compactifications of a completely regular Hausdorff space.

A uniform space  induces a proximity relation by declaring  is near  if and only if  has nonempty intersection with every entourage. Uniformly continuous maps will then be proximally continuous.

See also

References

External links 
 

Closure operators
General topology